is a Prefectural Natural Park in Akita Prefecture, Japan. Established in 1964, the park lies within the municipality of Happō (formerly within Hachimori).

See also
 National Parks of Japan
 Parks and gardens in Akita Prefecture

References

Parks and gardens in Akita Prefecture
Protected areas established in 1964
1964 establishments in Japan
Happō, Akita